La Granadera (Spanish for "The Grenadier") was the national anthem of the Federal Republic of Central America from 1823 until 1839.

Lyrics

References 

Historical national anthems
Federal Republic of Central America
1823 songs
North American anthems
1823 in Central America